Mundos Opuestos is the second studio album by American Latin pop duo Ha*Ash. It was published under the Sony BMG label on September 27, 2005. The album was produced by Áureo Baqueiro. Four singles were released from the album.

Four singles were released from Mundos Opuestos. "Amor a Medias" was released as the lead single in June 2005. The following singles, "Me Entrego a Ti", "¿Qué Hago Yo?" a are composition of the Colombian-american singer Soraya and "Tu Mirada en Mi" is a composition of the Peruvian singer-songwriter Gianmarco. The album features a cover of the song from 1935 "I Want to Be a Cowboy's Sweetheart".

Background and production 
Their second album, Mundos Opuestos was also produced by Áureo Baqueiro. The album features a cover of the song from 1935 I Want to Be a Cowboy's Sweetheart.

Release and promotion 
It was published under the Sony BMG label on September 27, 2005. A special edition of the album was released including one new tracks "Código Postal". The song was used as the main theme of the Televisa telenovela Código Postal.

Singles 

 "Amor a Medias" (Half Love)  was released as the album's lead single on July 8, 2008. It peaked at #4 on Monitor Latino in México.
 "Me Entrego a Ti" (I surrender to you) is chosen as the album second single released on November 24, 2008. It peaked at #15 on Billboard Latin Pop chart.
 "¿Qué Hago Yo?" (What do I do?) was released as the album's third single in February 2009. It peaked at #50 on Billboard Latin Pop chart and #1 on Monitor Latino in México. In 2007, it was certified platinum in the ringtone format.
 "Tu Mirada en Mi" (You look at me) was released as the album's fourth single in February 2009. It peaked at #50 on Billboard Latin Pop chart

Commercial performance 
The album peaked at #8 in the Mexican album charts. In 2005, the album was certified as gold in Mexico. On August 24, 2006, the album was certified as platinum in Mexico. The album eventually was certified platinum and gold in Mexico.

Track listing

Credits and personnel
Credits adapted from the album's liner notes.

Musicians

 Ashley Grace – vocals 
 Hanna Nicole – vocals 
 Áureo Baqueiro: drums , bass , chorus 
 Pepe Damián: drums 
 Javier Calderón: bass , electric guitar , acoustic guitar , mandolin 
 Gerardo García: electric guitar , acoustic guitar , mandolin 
 Pancho Ruiz: bass 
 Mr B: bass , electric guitar , acoustic guitar , mandolin 
 Dean Parks: pedal steel , lap steel 
 Gabe Witcher: violin 
 Tommy Morgan: harmonica 
 Carlos Murguía: hammond organ 
 Michelle Batrez: chorus

Production

 Áureo Baqueiro: producer , arrangements 
 Javier Calderón: arrangements 
 Gerardo García: arrangements 
 Memo Gil: mixing 
 Gustavo Borner: mixing 
 Don Tyler: mastering

Charts

Weekly charts

Year-end charts

Certifications

Release history

References

External links
Official band website

2005 albums
Ha*Ash albums
Spanish-language albums
Sony Music Latin albums